Rafe Raccini Wolfe (born 19 December 1985) is a Jamaican international footballer who plays professionally for Humble Lions, as a right back.

Early and personal life
Born in St Catherine, Wolfe is the brother of Wolry Wolfe and Kemeel Wolfe, and the cousin of Omar Cummings.

Club career
Wolfe has played in Jamaica, Belgium and Hungary for Portmore United, White Star Woluwe, Ferencváros, MTK Budapest, Győri ETO, Dunaújváros and Humble Lions.

International career
Wolfe made his international debut for Jamaica in 2008, and earned a total of seven caps over two years, scoring once.

Career statistics

References

1985 births
Living people
Jamaican footballers
Jamaica international footballers
Portmore United F.C. players
RWS Bruxelles players
Ferencvárosi TC footballers
MTK Budapest FC players
Győri ETO FC players
Dunaújváros PASE players
Humble Lions F.C. players
National Premier League players
Belgian Third Division players
Nemzeti Bajnokság I players
Association football fullbacks
Jamaican expatriate footballers
Jamaican expatriate sportspeople in Belgium
Expatriate footballers in Belgium
Jamaican expatriate sportspeople in Hungary
Expatriate footballers in Hungary
2009 CONCACAF Gold Cup players
People from Saint Catherine Parish